13B may refer to:

 Boron-13 (13B), an isotope of boron
A Mazda Wankel engine
A Toyota B engine
Yavarum Nalam or 13B, an Indian horror film
Section 13b of the Securities Exchange Act of 1934

See also
 B13 (disambiguation)